Lulin may refer to:

 Lulin, the name of two villages in Poland:
 Lulin, Grodzisk Wielkopolski County
 Lulin, Oborniki County
 Lulin (Chinese: 綠林 Green Forest), a name applied to early Chinese agrarian rebellious forces
 Lulin Observatory (Chinese: 鹿林 Deer Forest Observatory) in Taiwan
 Comet Lulin, a comet officially designated C/2007 N3 (Lulin)
 145523 Lulin, an asteroid
 Lulin, a village in Meuchuan, Wuxue, Huanggang, Hubei

See also
 Lu Lin (disambiguation)